HMS Acheron (P411) was an  of the Royal Navy, laid down 26 August 1944, launched 25 March 1947 and completed in 1948.

Design
Like all s, Acheron had a displacement of  when at the surface and  while submerged. The submarine was powered by two Admiralty ML eight-cylinder diesel engines generating a power of  each. It also contained four electric motors each producing  that drove two shafts.

Acheron was fitted with ten  torpedo tubes, one QF 4 inch naval gun Mk XXIII, one Oerlikon 20 mm cannon, and a .303 British Vickers machine gun. Its torpedo tubes were fitted to the bow and stern, and it could carry twenty torpedoes. Its complement was sixty-one crew members.

Service history
Acheron took part in the Coronation Review of the Fleet to celebrate the Coronation of Queen Elizabeth II in 1953. It carried out 'General Naval Service' around the UK until the end of 1964. A geomagnetic storm in February 1956, during solar cycle 19, interfered with radio communications and prompted a search for the submarine after it lost radio contact. From August to December 1959, It took part in a cruise to South Africa and Pakistan.

It was decommissioned and broken up in 1972 at the yard of J Cashmore of Newport.

Commanding officers

References

Publications

External links
 Pictures of HMS Acheron at MaritimeQuest

 

Amphion-class submarines
Cold War submarines of the United Kingdom
1947 ships